Anspach may refer to:

 The Anspach family
 Anspach (surname)
 Neu-Anspach, Hesse, Germany
 The former name of Ansbach, Bavaria, Germany

See also
 Ansbach (disambiguation)